The 2018 FIA WTCR Afriquia Race of Morocco was the opening round of the 2018 World Touring Car Cup and the first running of the FIA WTCR Race of Morocco. It was held on 7 and 8 April 2018 at the Circuit International Automobile Moulay El Hassan in Marrakech, Morocco. The first and third races were won by Gabriele Tarquini and the second won by Jean-Karl Vernay.

Entry list

A total of 25 cars were entered. The following teams and drivers were entered into the event:

Results

Qualifying 1

 Norbert Michelisz was given a grid penalty for an engine change after qualifying and moved to the back of the grid after qualifying second fastest.

Race 1

 Mehdi Bennani originally finished fifth but was given a 10-second time penalty for contact with Esteban Guerrieri.

Qualifying 2

Race 2

 John Filippi originally finished twelfth but was given a 30-second time penalty for contact with Benjamin Lessennes.

Race 3

Standings after the round
Drivers' Championship standings

Teams' Championship standings

References

External links
 

World Touring Car Cup
World Touring Car Cup
Touring car races